This Means War is the third album by British heavy metal band Tank, released in 1983. On this album, the line-up expanded to a four-piece, with the addition of second guitarist Mick Tucker, former member of the NWOBHM band White Spirit. Thanks to Tucker's songwriting contributions and to the sound expanded by an extra guitar, the band changed their music in comparison with their previous albums with longer, more melodic compositions, which helped differentiate Tank from Motörhead, the band they were often compared to.

Track listing 
All songs written by Tank.
Side one
 "Just Like Something from Hell" – 8:30
 "Hot Lead, Cold Steel" – 5:46
 "This Means War" – 5:18

Side two
 "Laughing in the Face of Death" – 5:16
 "(If We Go) We Go Down Fighting" – 5:26
 "I (Won't Ever Let You Down)" – 4:40
 "Echoes of a Distant Battle" – 5:03

CD edition bonus tracks
Since 2007, editions of the album have been available on CD with the following bonus tracks:

"The Man Who Never Was" (B-side of "Echoes of a Distant Battle" single) – 4:31
"Whichcatchewedmycuckoo" (additional B-side of "Echoes of a Distant Battle" 12") – 3:20
"Swapiyayo" (from French & Holland versions of This Means War LP) – 1:13

Personnel 
Tank
 Algy Ward – vocals, bass
 Peter Brabbs – guitar
 Mick Tucker – guitar
 Mark Brabbs – drums

Production
 Produced by John Verity
 Cover art by Chris Webster

References

1983 albums
Tank (band) albums
Music for Nations albums